Michael Persson (born 28 April 1959) is a Swedish weightlifter. He competed in the men's heavyweight I event at the 1980 Summer Olympics.

References

External links
 

1959 births
Living people
Swedish male weightlifters
Olympic weightlifters of Sweden
Weightlifters at the 1980 Summer Olympics
People from Sorsele Municipality
Sportspeople from Västerbotten County
20th-century Swedish people